Furir Bari Iftari is a tradition of giving various kinds of seasonal fruits, sweetmeats and different Iftar item to the house of one's daughter-in-law during the month of Ramadan, which is an age old custom in Sylhet region. This term has come from Sylheti word Furi (daughter) as the custom is based on a daughter and her family. Although the celebration is not any obligatory practice, many unpleasant incidents were reported in different places because of unable to give the Iftar. Statistics show that many women have also been tortured as a result of this custom. Many have died due to this system, while others have even committed suicide. Muslims observe the custom of their holy month of Ramadan, but this practice has no linking and obligation in Islam to be celebrated. Rather it is considered as a superstition or an evil practice at present days. Simultaneously it has become a mental, financial and social disorder for the father or family of a poor woman.

See also 
 White House Iftar dinner

References 

Culture in Sylhet
Dinner
Iftar foods